{{Infobox person 
| name               = Scott Fellows
| image              = Scott Fellows (cropped).jpg
| caption            = 
| birth_name         = 
| birth_date         = 
| birth_place        = New Haven, Connecticut, U.S.
| occupation         = 
| years_active       = 1991–present
| known_for          = Johnny TestThe Fairly OddParentsNed's Declassified School Survival GuideBig Time RushSupernoobs'
| website            = 
}}

Scott Fellows (born September 28, 1965) is an American television producer, writer, and director. He is known for creating the Nickelodeon shows Ned's Declassified School Survival Guide and Big Time Rush, the Cartoon Network (originally Kids' WB) show Johnny Test and its 2021 Netflix reboot.

 Career 
Fellows is the creator and executive producer of Nickelodeon's Ned's Declassified School Survival Guide, Kids WB!, Teletoon, and Netflix's Johnny Test, and Nickelodeon's hit Kid's Choice Award-winning TV series Big Time Rush. 100 Things to Do Before High School was premiered on Nickelodeon in 2015. His second animated series, Supernoobs, premiered on Cartoon Network in 2015.

Fellows had been previously working as a staff writer and executive producer on The Fairly OddParents. He also wrote some episodes of Recess. His earlier writing credits also include episodes of Weinerville (where he performed Zip, Louie, and Professor Phosphate), U to U, All That, 100 Deeds for Eddie McDowd, Doug, and the unaired pilot for I Don't Think So''.

Filmography

TV series

Movies

References

External links

1965 births
Living people
American expatriates in Canada
American television producers
American television directors
American television writers
American male television writers
Nickelodeon Animation Studio people
Showrunners